Saifai is a large village and university town in the Etawah district of Indian state of Uttar Pradesh. It is also a sub-division (Tehsil) and Block (Kshetra Panchayat) of the Etawah district. It is the birthplace of Mulayam Singh Yadav, the founding president of Samajwadi Party, former Minister of Defence, India and former Chief Minister of Uttar Pradesh.

Geography
Saifai, categorised as a village, is situated in Etawah district at the border with Mainpuri district. Its geographical location falls under Ganges-Yamuna Doab of Uttar Pradesh.

Area of Saifai village is 887.47 hectares and area of Saifai Block (Kshetra Panchayat) is 20,403.30 hectares.  It is located 23 km towards North from District headquarters and nearest city Etawah. Mainpuri is located 32 km away from Saifai. It is about 110 km away from historic city of Taj Mahal, Agra and 230 km from State capital Lucknow.

Saifai Tehsil and Block
Saifai is a Sub-Division (Tehsil) and Block (Kshetra Panchayat) of Etawah district, Uttar Pradesh. There are about 60 villages in Saifai block. Saifai Block (Kshetra Panchayat) comes under Jaswantnagar Vidhan Sabha constituency and Mainpuri Lok Sabha constituency.

Education

University
Uttar Pradesh University of Medical Sciences (formerly U.P. Rural Institute of Medical Sciences and Research) a medical research public university established by Government of Uttar Pradesh under Act 15 of 2016. The university is running full-fledged Medical College, Paramedical College, Nursing College, Pharmacy College, Multi Specialty 850 bedded hospital and 150 bedded trauma and burn centre. 500 bedded super specialty hospital is being established in the university by Government of Uttar Pradesh with budget of 650 crores.

Colleges
Pharmacy College Saifai, established in 2015, first government aided pharmacy college run by UP Government. Earlier affiliated with UPTU, now part of Uttar Pradesh University of Medical Sciences.

Chaudhary Charan Singh Post Graduate College, Heonra-Saifai, Etawah or Chaudhary Charan Singh Degree College is a government aided Post Graduate College in Saifai. The college is situated in nearby Heonra village.
Major Dhyan Chand Sports College, Saifai, a residential sports college established in 2014. It offers teaching from 6th to 12th standard and sports training in cricket, football, hockey, wrestling, athletics, badminton, swimming and kabaddi.
Chaudhary Charan Singh College of Law, Heonra-Saifai, Etawah is offering under-graduate course in Law faculty. The college is situated in Heonra village which is part of Saifai Block (Kshetra Panchayat) and neighbour village of Saifai village.
S.S. Memorial Educational Academy, Saifai offers 2 year B.T.C. which is now known as Diploma in Elementary Education (D.El.Ed.) in Uttar Pradesh.

Schools
S.S. Memorial Senior Secondary Public School, Saifai, a co-ed institute with English as the medium of instruction. The school is affiliated to CBSE, New Delhi and NCERT published books are introduced form class VI and onwards.

Training centres
 
 Government Industrial Training Institute, Saifai is situated in Saifai and officers various trades.

Sports Authority of India (SAI) Training Centre, in Saifai's Master Chandgi Ram Sports Stadium campus. It offers residential training in Athletics, Handball and Wrestling.

Transport

Road
Saifai village is connected  to Mainpuri and Etawah by a four-lane State Highway 83 (Uttar Pradesh). Agra-Lucknow Expressway is passing near to Saifai, giving it express connectivity to Delhi, Agra, Kannauj and Lucknow. Saifai also has a bus station and a depot, owned and operated by Uttar Pradesh State Road Transport Corporation (UPSRTC) at which UPSRTC buses are available to all major destinations of the state. Saifai Depot of UPSRTC has 25 buses as of December 2020.

Rail
Saifai railway station, also spelled as Saiphai railway station is situated at newly built Mainpuri-Etawah line railway track. It connects Saifai to Etawah railway station, which is situated at Howrah–Delhi main line.

Airport

The Saifai airstrip is used only by unscheduled chartered flights. In 2015, the Indian Air Force conducted emergency landing tests at the airstrip with the Mirage 2000 aircraft. In 2018, the air force conducted a second practice exercise at the airstrip.

Census 2011

Village
According to Census 2011, Saifai had 1481 families, with a population of 7141 of which 3917 are males and were 3224 are females. 

The population of children with age 0–6 is 1059 which makes up 14.83% of total population of village. The average sex ratio of 823 is lower than Uttar Pradesh state average of 912. The child sex ratio of 912 is higher than the Uttar Pradesh average of 902.

The village also has higher literacy rate compared to Uttar Pradesh. In 2011, literacy rate was 82.44% compared to 67.68% of Uttar Pradesh, male literacy stood at 89.27% while female literacy rate was 74.00%.

Block (Vikas Khand/Kshetra Panchayat)
According to Census 2011, Saifai  has 19,578 families residing. The Saifai Block (Vikas Khand/Kshetra Panchayat) has population of 1,12,620 of which 60,479 are males while 52,141 are females as per Population Census 2011.

Stadiums
According to the newspaper The Hindu, Saifai is in a process to establish itself as a sports and education hub in the state and has two sports complexes. 
Saifai International Cricket Stadium along with an athletics stadium, an indoor stadium, an indoor swimming pool at the Major Dhyan Chand Sports College, Saifai campus.
Master Chandgiram Sports Stadium, named after Haryanvi wrestler Chandgi Ram, a national-level sports complex with a hockey pitch, a multipurpose (badminton and wrestling) hall and a swimming pool.

Saifai Mahotsav
Organised between 1997 and 2015, Saifai Mahotsav (officially the Ranveer Singh Smriti Saifai Mahotsav) was an annual 15-day cultural fair organised by the Ranveer Singh Smriti Saifai Mahotsav committee. It used to takes place in the village every year during December and January. It was started in 1997 by Ranveer Singh Yadav, the nephew of Mulayam Singh Yadav and father of Tej Pratap Singh Yadav, as a small village fair named Saifai Mahotsav. It was renamed as the Ranveer Singh Smriti Saifai Mahotsav after his death in 2002. The festival's closing ceremony which was also known as Bollywood Night often turned into controversy due to the participation of Bollywood celebrities. The organisation of Saifai Mahotsav was cancelled in 2016 during Samajwadi Party's government and has not been organised again.

Nearby Cities

Municipal Corporation (Nagar Nigam) 
 Agra

Nagar Palika Parishad 
 Jaswantnagar
 Etawah
 Mainpuri
 Sirsaganj

Nagar Panchayat 
 Karhal

Notable people

Akhilesh Yadav, 20th Chief Minister of Uttar Pradesh (March 2012 - March 2017)
Mulayam Singh Yadav, founder president of Samajwadi Party, former Minister of Defence (India) & former Chief Minister of Uttar Pradesh
Shivpal Singh Yadav

References

 
Villages in Etawah district
Yadav family of Uttar Pradesh